Highland is a station on the Port Authority of Allegheny County's light rail network, located in Bethel Park, Pennsylvania. Located in a railroad cut, the stop is designed as a small commuter stop, serving area residents who walk to the train so they can be taken toward Downtown Pittsburgh. A staircase to each platform is available from Highland Road, which crosses over the line on an overpass. In addition, access to the outbound platform is available through a walkway which leads to Santa Fe Drive. There is no grade crossing for passengers at the station.

References

External links 

Port Authority T Stations Listings
Highland Road entrance from Google Maps Street View

Port Authority of Allegheny County stations
Railway stations in the United States opened in 1984
Blue Line (Pittsburgh)
Red Line (Pittsburgh)